Four referendums were held in Switzerland during 1923. The first two were held on 18 February on protective custody and a federal resolution on relations with France over the former free trade area of Haute-Savoie. The third was held on 15 April on a popular initiative "for the ensuring of people's rights in questions regarding tariffs", whilst the fourth was held on 3 June on amending articles 31 and 32bis of the constitution regarding alcohol. All four were rejected by voters.

Background
The referendums on protective custody and tariffs were both popular initiatives, which required a double majority; a majority of the popular vote and majority of the cantons. The decision of each canton was based on the vote in that canton. Full cantons counted as one vote, whilst half cantons counted as half. The referendum on relations with France was a "facultative referendum", which required only a simple majority of voters in favour, whilst the referendum on amending the constitution was a mandatory referendum, which also required a double majority.

Results

Protective custody

Relations with France

Tariffs

Constitutional amendments

References

1923 referendums
1923 in Switzerland
Referendums in Switzerland